Welch is a census-designated place and unincorporated community in Dawson County, Texas, United States. As of the 2010 census it had a population of 222.

The Dawson Independent School District serves area students.

References

External links
 

Unincorporated communities in Texas
Census-designated places in Dawson County, Texas
Census-designated places in Texas